Paul P. Gross is a meteorologist at WDIV-TV Channel 4, the NBC affiliate station in Detroit, Michigan.

Gross studied meteorology at the University of Michigan's Department of Atmospheric, Oceanic and Space Science, and he interned with WDIV during his sophomore year, eventually being hired in an off-air position in his senior year. He would eventually work on the air at two stations in Metro Detroit, and one in Lansing.  

Gross earned a spot on the American Meteorological Society's (AMS) Board of Broadcast Meteorology in 1987, and became chairman in 1990. He remains on the AMS's Committee on the Station Scientist. He is a nine-time Michigan Emmy winner.

Gross wrote a book titled Extreme Michigan Weather: The Wild World of the Great Lakes State, which was published in June 2010 through the University of Michigan Press.

Personal life
Paul Gross and his wife have two sons. He belongs to a Reform Jewish synagogue, Temple Kol Ami in West Bloomfield, Michigan.

References

External links 
 Paul Gross' media kit at The University of Michigan Press
 Story about Gross in The Nation's Health
 Video of Paul Gross as part of the Environmental Protection Agency's Sunwise Program
 Paul Gross podcast and Q&A on Extreme Michigan Weather
 Q&A with Paul Gross at The Mauritian Connection
 Extreme Michigan Weather Facebook page
 WDIV-TV Weather Team Entry
 WDET-FM interview with Paul Gross on global warming
 The Weather Channel debate on climate change featuring Paul Gross

Year of birth missing (living people)
Living people
American television meteorologists
University of Michigan College of Engineering alumni